Ratibor I (Racibor) ( 1124 – 1156) of the House of Pomerania (Griffins) was Duke of Pomerania. He was married to Pribislawa, and was the ancestor of the Ratiborides sideline of the Griffins.

Initially he might have ruled the Land of Słupsk-Sławno and also ruled the duchy of his brother Wartislaw I who was slain by pagans in place of his minor sons from 1136 to 1156.

In 1135, he raided the Norwegian city of Kungahälla (now Kungälv in Sweden).

During the Wendish Crusade in 1147, he managed to end the siege of Szczecin together with Wolin bishop Adalbert.

In 1153, Ratibor and Adalbert founded Stolpe Abbey at the Peene River near Gützkow.

With Pribislawa Iaroslavovna (Princess of Volhynia), he had at least four children.

 Swantepolk II (or Swantopolk), who succeeded his father in Słupsk-Sławno
 Margareta (or Margarete) ∞ Bernhard I of Ratzeburg
 Bogislav (or Wartislaw) 
 Dobroslawa

See also
List of Pomeranian duchies and dukes
History of Pomerania
Duchy of Pomerania
House of Pomerania
Lands of Schlawe and Stolp

1120s births
1156 deaths
Christians of the Wendish Crusade
Dukes of Pomerania